American singer, songwriter and rapper Coco Jones has released four extended plays, sixteen singles, as well as several other features on film and television soundtracks. Her first appearance was on her debut independent project, Coco Jones. Soon after she  began a concert tour revolving around the theme of anti-bullying called UBU-Stop the Bullying.

Jones signed a record deal with Hollywood Records and began working with Grammy-nominated producer Rob Galbraith, co-writing and recording all-new original music. Jones' debut single "Holla at the DJ" premiered on Radio Disney on December 6, 2012 with its release on iTunes the next day. The video for the track premiered on the Disney Channel on December 12, with a premiere on VEVO just afterwards. Her extended play Made Of was released on March 12, 2013 and toured with Mindless Behavior later that year. Jones performed with Mindless Behavior at Radio Disney's Radio Disney Music Awards, and took home an award for "Funniest Celebrity Take." Following the release of the EP, Jones worked in the studio with David Banner, Ester Dean, and Jukebox, with plans to release her debut album by August.

In January 2014, Jones was dropped from Hollywood Records, becoming an independent artist. On August 29, 2014, Jones released a lyric video for her debut independent single, "Peppermint". It was officially released on iTunes on September 4, 2014.In November 2017 She drops 'Let Me Check It' followed by and EP with the same name. In September of 2018 she released a song called "Just My Luck" along with its music video.
On September 3, 2019, Jones released a song called "Depressed". On September 20, 2019, she released an 8-track EP titled H.D.W.Y..

She made a comeback to music in March 2022 with the release of her single, "Caliber", after signing with Def Jam Recordings in February 2022. She then released her second studio EP later in the year on November 4th, "What I Didn't Tell You". Followed by the Deluxe January 20th 2023.

Albums

Extended plays

Singles

As lead artist

As featured artist

Guest appearances

References

Discographies of American artists